Ellen Weinberg-Hughes (born July 8, 1968) is an American former ice hockey player. She competed internationally for the US women's national team at the 1992 Women's World Championship, capturing a silver medal while being named to the tournament's all-star team. She played collegiate hockey, lacrosse and soccer for the University of New Hampshire. She was inducted into the UNH Athletic Hall of Fame in 2012. After her playing career was over, she served as an assistant coach at UNH for the soccer and ice hockey teams, while attending graduate school. She also served as an advisor to Norway's women's hockey team in 1994.

Early life and athletic career

Weinberg-Hughes was born on July 8, 1968 in St. Louis, Missouri, and was raised in Dallas, Texas. She competed in three sports (ice hockey, soccer, and lacrosse) at the University of New Hampshire (UNH) during her collegiate career. As a lacrosse player, Weinberg-Hughes was a member of the UNH women's team that made it to the national semi-finals in 1987. As a soccer player, Weinberg-Hughes played midfield and forward. As a freshman, she was named to the All-New England Team, and helped her team to the Eastern College Athletic Conference (ECAC) final game. She finished her soccer career at UNH having played in 70 games, recording 11 goals and 16 assists. As an ice hockey player, Weinberg-Hughes played defense, and was noted to be a smooth skater and good passer. In 1991, she was named to the ECAC All-Star Team. In her UNH ice hockey career, Weinberg-Hughes scored 6 goals and added 32 assists in 79 career games. In 2012, she was inducted in the University of New Hampshire Athletic Hall of Fame.

After completing her collegiate eligibility, Weinberg-Hughes stayed at UNH to pursue a graduate degree. During this time, she served as an assistant coach to the women's ice hockey and soccer teams. In 1992, Weinberg-Hughes was named to the US women's hockey team for the 1992 Women's World Championship. She played in five tournament games, recording 4 assists. Team USA captured a silver medal at the tournament, and Weinberg-Hughes was named to the tournament all-star team at its conclusion. In 1994, Weinberg-Hughes was serving as an adviser to Norway's national team.

Personal life
After her athletic career, Weinberg-Hughes worked in broadcasting, covering soccer and hockey. During the 1999 Women's World Cup, she worked for ESPN as a sideline reporter. She also worked covering soccer for the Big Ten Network, but stepped back from her career when her sons' playing careers got too busy. Weinberg-Hughes' husband, Jim, is a former ice hockey player and coach who has worked in the Toronto Marlies and Toronto Maple Leafs organizations. They have three sons, all of whom are considered high-level National Hockey League players. Quinn was drafted seventh overall in the 2018 NHL Entry Draft by the Vancouver Canucks. Jack was drafted first overall in the 2019 NHL Entry Draft by the New Jersey Devils. Her youngest son Luke was drafted fourth overall by the New Jersey Devils in the 2021 NHL Entry Draft. Weinberg-Hughes taught all three of her sons how to skate. Weinberg-Hughes is Jewish.

See also
List of select Jewish ice hockey players

References

1968 births
Living people
Sportspeople from Dallas
Ice hockey people from St. Louis
Soccer players from St. Louis
Ice hockey people from Texas
Ice hockey people from Missouri
American women's ice hockey defensemen
New Hampshire Wildcats women's ice hockey players
Soccer players from Texas
Soccer players from Missouri
American women's soccer players
New Hampshire Wildcats women's soccer players
Women's association football midfielders
Women's association football forwards
Lacrosse players from Texas
American lacrosse players
New Hampshire Wildcats women's lacrosse players
Jewish American sportspeople
Jewish ice hockey players
Jewish footballers
21st-century American Jews
21st-century American women